Martín Bermúdez Mendoza (born July 19, 1958 in El Carrizalillo, Michoacán) is a retired male race walker from Mexico.

Personal bests

 20 km: 1:22:30 h, 11 October 1981, Zaragoza
 50 km: 3:43:36 h, 30 September 1979, Eschborn

International competitions

References

External links

1958 births
Living people
Sportspeople from Michoacán
Mexican male racewalkers
Olympic athletes of Mexico
Athletes (track and field) at the 1980 Summer Olympics
Athletes (track and field) at the 1984 Summer Olympics
Athletes (track and field) at the 1988 Summer Olympics
Pan American Games medalists in athletics (track and field)
Pan American Games gold medalists for Mexico
Athletes (track and field) at the 1979 Pan American Games
Athletes (track and field) at the 1983 Pan American Games
Athletes (track and field) at the 1987 Pan American Games
World Athletics Championships athletes for Mexico
Central American and Caribbean Games gold medalists for Mexico
Central American and Caribbean Games silver medalists for Mexico
Competitors at the 1986 Central American and Caribbean Games
World Athletics Race Walking Team Championships winners
Central American and Caribbean Games medalists in athletics
Medalists at the 1979 Pan American Games
Medalists at the 1983 Pan American Games
Medalists at the 1987 Pan American Games
20th-century Mexican people